Deserticossus volgensis is a species of moth in the family Cossidae. It is found in Russia (southern Volga region), the northern Caucasus (Stavropol, Dagestan), north-western Kazakhstan and Turkey. 

Its wingspan is about 21 mm,.

References

Moths described in 1893
Cossinae
Moths of Europe
Moths of Asia